Hickory Creek is a tributary of the Peace River in Hardee County, Florida in the United States.

References

Rivers of Florida